Gilbrano Plet (born 5 March 1993 in Amsterdam) is a Dutch professional footballer who currently plays as a winger for Spakenburg in the Dutch Topklasse. He formerly played for Almere City.

External links
 Voetbal International profile 

1993 births
Living people
Dutch footballers
Almere City FC players
Eerste Divisie players
Derde Divisie players
Footballers from Amsterdam
Association football midfielders